The 1994 Texas Rangers season was cut short by the infamous 1994 player's strike. At the time when the strike began, the Rangers were leading the American League West with a record of 52 wins and 62 losses. It was their first season at The Ballpark in Arlington.

Offseason
November 22, 1993: Will Clark was signed as a free agent by the Rangers.
December 18, 1993: Billy Ripken was signed as a free agent by the Rangers.

Regular season
Despite compiling a record of just 52-62 by Friday, August 12, the Rangers were actually leading the AL West Division. They had scored 613 runs (5.38 per game) and allowed 697 runs (6.11 per game).

The Rangers' pitching struggled over the course of the strike-shortened season, finishing 1st in most runs allowed (697) and most home runs allowed (157). However on July 28, Kenny Rogers pitched the 14th perfect game in Major League Baseball history, blanking the California Angels 4–0 at The Ballpark at Arlington. Needing 98 pitches to complete his masterpiece, Rogers struck out eight batters. He also survived three-ball counts to seven Angel hitters.

Season standings

Record vs. opponents

Notable transactions
 June 2, 1994: Scott Podsednik was drafted by the Rangers in the 3rd round of the 1994 Major League Baseball draft. Player signed June 5, 1994.
 June 29, 1994: Tim Leary was signed as a free agent by the Rangers.

Roster

Player stats

Batting

Starters by position 
Note: Pos = Position; G = Games played; AB = At bats; H = Hits; Avg. = Batting average; HR = Home runs; RBI = Runs batted in

Other batters 
Note: G = Games played; AB = At bats; H = Hits; Avg. = Batting average; HR = Home runs; RBI = Runs batted in

Pitching

Starting pitchers 
Note: G = Games pitched; IP = Innings pitched; W = Wins; L = Losses; ERA = Earned run average; SO = Strikeouts

Other pitchers 
Note: G = Games pitched; IP = Innings pitched; W = Wins; L = Losses; ERA = Earned run average; SO = Strikeouts

Relief pitchers 
Note: G = Games pitched; W = Wins; L = Losses; SV = Saves; ERA = Earned run average; SO = Strikeouts

Awards and honors
Iván Rodríguez, C, Gold Glove
Iván Rodríguez, Silver Slugger Award,
All-Star Game

Farm system

References

1994 Texas Rangers at Baseball Reference
1994 Texas Rangers at Baseball Almanac

Texas Rangers seasons
Texas Rangers season
Range